The Men's Super-G competition in the 2016 FIS Alpine Skiing World Cup involved eight events, including the finals in St. Moritz, Switzerland.

In the previous four seasons, this discipline had been won by two different Norwegians, Aksel Lund Svindal (2012–14) and Kjetil Jansrud (2015), and Svindal started the season out as if he were going to reclaim the title, wining three of the first four Super-G races.  However, two days after winning the Super-G in Kitzbühel, Svindal (along with Austria's Georg Streitberger) suffered a season-ending injury in a downhill there.  That opened up the race for the discipline title, which then became a wide-open battle that also included 23-year-old Norwegian skier Aleksander Aamodt Kilde. After Jansrud won the next-to-last Super-G of the season in Kvitfjell, Kilde had a five-point lead on the inactive Svindal, a 37-point lead on Austria's Vincent Kriechmayr, and a 40-point lead over Jansrud. In the finals, Kilde and Jansrud tied for second, earning each 80 points and giving the crystal globe to Kilde (extending Norway's dominance to five seasons) as part of an all-Norwegian podium with Jansrud and Svindal.

Standings

DNF = Did Not Finish
DSQ = Disqualified
DNS = Did Not Start

See also
 2016 Alpine Skiing World Cup – Men's summary rankings
 2016 Alpine Skiing World Cup – Men's Overall
 2016 Alpine Skiing World Cup – Men's Downhill
 2016 Alpine Skiing World Cup – Men's Giant Slalom
 2016 Alpine Skiing World Cup – Men's Slalom
 2016 Alpine Skiing World Cup – Men's Combined
 World Cup scoring system

References

External links
 Alpine Skiing at FIS website

Men's Super-G
FIS Alpine Ski World Cup men's Super-G discipline titles